ABC HD is an Australian free-to-air public television channel.

Following the government's decision to remove the SD Primary Channel limitations, the channel returned as an HD simulcast on channel 20 on 6 December 2016.

On 6 December 2016, when ABC HD was revived, ABC News's HD feed was removed and reduced to standard-definition television (SDTV).

History

Origins
Starting on 1 January 2002, the ABC began a prime-time simulcast of ABC's Sydney station ABN, except that it had no watermark and was upconverted from standard definition to 1080i high definition. On 1 January 2005 it was changed to 576p to accommodate the launch of new channel ABC2 (now ABC TV Plus) and gradually expanded its operating hours.

2008 rebrand
On 1 January 2008, the ABC's high definition simulcast was rebranded as ABC HD, relaunching as a high definition multichannel with its own logo and branding. The channel was also enhanced to 720p to mark the start of native high-definition content.

Throughout its multichannel era, ABC HD continued providing a high definition simulcast of ABN Sydney. As a result, viewers outside of New South Wales would see Sydney-based news bulletins and other localised content. The purpose of this as of 2008, was to provide high-definition versions of ABC1 shows when available (Prior to this, the broadcaster relied on regulation exemptions that allowed it to meet a high-definition quota using content upscaled from standard definition).

There were exceptions to the ABC1 simulcast: During the 2008 Summer Paralympics in Beijing, ABC HD became a dedicated sports broadcaster, simulcasting the dedicated coverage on ABC2 for most of the day. The 2009 VFL Grand Final was shown exclusively live on ABC HD. For a time up until ABC HD branding ceased, ABC HD screened a "7:30 Select" national highlights package instead of the Sydney version of Stateline.

Closure
On 10 June 2010, ABC HD's unique branding was replaced with that of ABC1, reverting the channel to an ABN Sydney simulcast. ABC HD ceased being a simulcast of ABC1 from 6 July 2010 in Tasmania and the ACT; 7 July 2010 in Queensland, South Australia, Western Australia and Northern Territory; and on 8 July 2010 in Victoria and New South Wales, all replaced by a looped pre-launch promotion for ABC News 24 (now ABC News) on channel 24. This made ABC the second broadcaster in Australia to permanently discontinue the high definition simulcast of its main channel, following the removal of 10 HD to create 10's former sports and now entertainment channel 10 Bold in 2009.

2016 revival
Following the government's decision to remove SD primary channel limitations, ABC Director of Television Richard Finlayson announced in November 2015 that the ABC would recommence simulcasting in high definition in June 2016. However, the launch date was later pushed back to an indefinite time in late 2016 due to technical reasons, with the launch date finally announced as 6 December 2016. However, in contrast to its past, ABC HD provided region-specific simulcasting, not just a nationwide simulcast of ABN Sydney. Additionally, the channel broadcast in MPEG-4 format as opposed to the traditional MPEG-2 format. As a result of the channel's revival, the ABC News channel was reduced to a standard definition broadcast.

Availability

Original channel
ABC HD was available exclusively in 720p high definition from the network's eight states stations ABC Australian Capital Territory, ABD Northern Territory, ABN New South Wales, ABQ Queensland, ABS South Australia, ABT Tasmania, ABV Victoria, ABW Western Australia.

Revival channel
Upon its revival on 6 December 2016, ABC HD returned to 1080i50 high definition, but it broadcast in MPEG-4 format as opposed to the standard MPEG-2 format. ABC HD covered all ABC-owned state stations.

ABC HD is available to Foxtel cable subscribers via its HD+ package.

Logo history

See also

List of digital television channels in Australia
High-definition television in Australia

References

Australian Broadcasting Corporation television
Television channels and stations established in 2008
English-language television stations in Australia
Television channels and stations disestablished in 2010
Television channels and stations established in 2016
Digital terrestrial television in Australia
High-definition television